Rough But Respectable or I Am a Chic Charro (Spanish: Soy charro de levita) is a 1949 Mexican comedy film directed by Gilberto Martínez Solares and starring Germán Valdés, Marcelo Chávez and Rosita Quintana.

Partial cast 
 Germán Valdés as Tin Tan  
 Marcelo Chávez as Marcelo  
 Rosita Quintana as Rosita García  
 Carmen Molina as Carmelita  
 Arturo Martínez as Sotol  
 Felipe de Alba as Enrique Méndez  
 Julio Villarreal as Don Agripino  
 Óscar Pulido as Don Melitón Dávila, presidente municipal  
 Juan García as Sanforizado 
 Queta Lavat as Leonor Dávila  
 Emma Roldán as La Coronela  
 Jorge Arriaga as Teófilo  
 Lupe Inclán as Portera 
 Nicolás Rodríguez as Don Hermilo  
 Dolores Corona

References

Bibliography 
 Holmstrom, John. The moving picture boy: an international encyclopaedia from 1895 to 1995. Michael Russell, 1996.

External links 
 

1949 films
1949 comedy films
Mexican comedy films
1940s Spanish-language films
Films directed by Gilberto Martínez Solares
Mexican black-and-white films
1940s Mexican films